Systems/Layers is the final LP by the instrumental group Rachel's. It was released on October 7, 2003, on Quarterstick Records.  The album is a collaborative dance/theater piece with the New York ensemble SITI Company.

The album peaked at No. 16 on the Billboard Classical Albums chart.

Reception
Initial critical response to Systems/Layers was positive. At Metacritic, which assigns a normalized rating out of 100 to reviews from mainstream critics, the album has received an average score of 81, based on 14 reviews. PopMatters called the album "one of the year's finest releases," writing that "its greatest gift ... is its sheer compatibility -- you can take Systems/Layers anywhere and it will speak to you." Exclaim! called it "at once touching and haunted, intimate and disturbingly uncomfortable." The Times deemed it the band's worst album. The East Bay Express labeled it "the soundtrack to your most brilliant, reflective life."

Track listing
 "Moscow Is in the Telephone" – 3:59
 "Water from the Same Source" – 6:18
 "Systems/Layers" – 3:11
 "Expect Delays" – 3:57
 "Arterial" – 1:45
 "Even/Odd" – 3:14
 "Wouldn't Live Anywhere Else" – 2:47
 "Esperanza" – 5:32
 "Packet Switching" – 1:09
 "Where_Have_All_My_Files_Gone?" – 2:49
 "Reflective Surfaces" – 2:00
 "Unclear Channel" – 2:47
 "Last Things Last" – 3:33
 "Anytime Soon" – 2:18
 "Air Conditioning / A Closed Feeling" – 3:39
 "Singing Bridge" – 2:13
 "And Keep Smiling" – 2:38
 "4 or 5 Trees" – 6:04
 "NY Snow Globe" – 2:28

Personnel
 Kyle Crabtree – drums
 Christian Frederickson – viola, keyboards 
 Edward Grimes – drums, keyboards
 Rachel Grimes – piano, keyboards
 Greg King – films
 Eve Miller – cello
 Jason Noble – bass, guitar, drums, toolbelt, keyboards
 Matthew Annin – French horn
 Wendy Doyle – cello
 Doug Elmore – stand-up bass
 Jane Halliday – violin
 Sarah Hill – violin
Stephen Webber – spoken word on "4 or 5 Trees"
 Shannon Wright – vocals on "Last Things Last"

Footnotes

Rachel's albums
2003 albums
Quarterstick Records albums